Annelies Van Parys (born 5 June 1975) is a Belgian classical composer of chamber music, symphonic music, music for theatre productions and opera.

Life
Born in Bruges, Van Parys studied at the Royal Conservatory of Ghent, piano with Johan Duijck and composition with Luc Brewaeys.

She composed in 2001 Phrases V for guitar, harp, piano and percussion. The piece of about 9 minutes was written for the Ictus Ensemble and premiered in Bruges by the ensemble Contr'Art. It was awarded the prize Vlaanderen/Quebec and was performed in Montreal on 15 May 2002. In 2005, she wrote Méditation, a piece of about 7 minutes for a double wind quintet. Her first symphony, written on a commission by Luc Brewaeys and subtitled "Carillon", was premiered at the Centre for Fine Arts, Brussels (BOZAR), on 26 October 2006 by deFilharmonie conducted by Sian Edwards.

She composed Poème for solo voice for the mezzo-soprano Els Mondelaers, who premiered it at the Academia Belgica in Rome on 30 March 2006. Van Parys wrote Stanza for solo harp on a commission of the  where it was premiered by Isabelle Moretti in a concert on 8 March 2007. She composed music for Ruhe, a performance of the Muziektheater Transparant which also featured part songs by Schubert. It was shown, with the Collegium Vocale Gent conducted by Christoph Siebert, from 2007 to 2010 at festivals in Europe and Australia. The second symphony "Les Ponts" was written for the  who premiered it, conducted by Otto Tausk at the Brussels Conservatory on 14 March 2008.

Van Parys composed An Index of Memories for five voices and ensemble in 2009 and 2010, for a theatrical performance of the Spectra Ensemble. Directed by Caroline Petrick, it was premiered in a production of Muziektheater Transparant at deSingel in Antwerp on 12 March 2010. The music was performed by Vocaallab Nederland, Spectra Ensemble and Triatu, conducted by Marit Strindlund. Van Parys wrote Een Oresteia for three women's voices and ensemble on a commission by Eduard van Beinumstichting. Another theatrical work, it was first produced at the Concertgebouw, Bruges, on 18 February 2011, again by Muziektheater Transparant directed by Petrick. The music was performed by the Vocaallab Nederland (Bauwien Vandermeer, Els Mondelaers, Elsbeth Gerritsen) and the ensemble Asko/Schönberg conducted by Alejo Pérez. Her first opera, Private Views, on a libretto by Tom Creed, was premiered by Muziektheater Transparant on 13 May 2015.

Van Parys has been a teacher of composition and form analysis at the Royal Conservatory of Brussels, and of piano at the Conservatory of Bruges.

Awards 
Van Parys was awarded the Vlaanderen/Quebeq Prize 2001, the prize Jeugd en Muziek in 2004, and the prize of the Brothers Darche in 2009. She was a laureat of the Royal Flemish Academy for Arts and Sciences of Belgium in 2011, and a member of the Academy from 2014.

References

External links 
 
 
 
 Annelies Van Parys MusMa
 Componiste Annelies Van Parys: "Johannespassie heeft einde in mineur nodig" (interview, in Dutch) demorgen.be
 Interview met Annelies van Parys / over haar bekroonde opera Private View (interview, in Dutch) vpro.nl 17 May 2015

Belgian classical composers
Musicians from Bruges
1975 births
Living people
Belgian women composers
21st-century Belgian musicians
21st-century classical composers
Women classical composers
21st-century women composers